Switzerland competed at the 2015 European Games, in Baku, Azerbaijan from 12 to 28 June 2015.

Medalists

Archery

Badminton

Men's singles – Mathias Bonny
Women's singles – Nicole Ankli
Mixed doubles – Céline Burkart, Oliver Schaller

Beach volleyball

 Men's – Sébastien Chevallier / Marco Krattiger, Alexei Strasser / Nico Beeler
 Women's – Nina Betschart / Nicole Eiholzer

Boxing

Men's 81kg – Uke Smajli
Women's 60kg – Sandra Brügger
Women's 64kg – Anaïs Kistler

Canoeing 

Men's 1000m and 5000m – Fabio Wyss

Cycling

BMX – Renaud Blanc , David Graf
Mountain Bike – Lukas Flückiger, Fabian Giger, Nino Schurter, Katrin Leumann, Jolanda Neff, Kathrin Stirnemann
Road Race – Lukas Jaun, Martin Kohler, Simon Pellaud, Patrick Schelling, Simon Zahner

Fencing

Men's Épée – Bruce Brunold, Georg Kuhn, Michele Niggeler, Florian Staub

Gymnastics

Artistic
Men's – Michael Meier, Taha Serhani, Eddy Yusof
Women's – Caterina Barloggio, Jessica Diacci, Giulia Steingruber

Rhythmic
 Women's – Gina Dünser, Stephanie Kälin, Julia Novak, Lisa Rusconi, Tamara Stanisic, Nicole Turuani

Trampoline
Switzerland qualified two athlete based on the results at the 2014 European Trampoline Championships. The two male gymnasts will compete in both the individual and the synchronized event.
 Men's – Simon Progin, Nicolas Schori
 Women's – Fanny Chilo, Sylvie Wirth

Judo

Men's 60kg – Ludovic Chammartin
Men's 90kg – Ciril Grossklaus, Domenic Wenzinger
Men's 100kg – Flavio Orlik
Women's 57kg – Emilie Amaron, Larissa Csatari
Women's 70kg – Juliane Robra

Karate

Women's 68kg – Elena Quirici

Shooting

Men's – Simon Beyeler, Claude-Alain Delley, Jan Lochbihler, Pascal Loretan, Fabio Ramella
Women's – Heidi Diethelm Gerber, Sarah Hornung, Petra Lustenberger, Jasmin Mischler, Marina Schnider

Taekwondo

Women's 57kg – Manuela Bezzola
Women's 67kg – Nina Kläy

Triathlon

Men's – Andrea Salvisberg
Women's – Nicola Spirig

Wrestling

Switzerland competed in wrestling.

References

Nations at the 2015 European Games
European Games
2015